John Durrant may refer to:

John Hartley Durrant,  entomologist
John Durrant (MP) for Hastings

See also
Jack Durrant, footballer